Baron Macabre is a fictional character appearing in American comic books published by Marvel Comics.

Publication history
Baron Macabre first appeared in Jungle Action #9 (May 1974), and was created by Don McGregor and Gil Kane.

The character subsequently appears in Jungle Action #10-11 (July, September 1974), and #17 (September 1975).

Fictional character biography
Baron Macabre is a Wakandan subversive capable of reanimating the dead as zuvembies.  He was an ally of Erik Killmonger and came into conflict with the Black Panther.

Powers and abilities
Baron Macabre was empowered by the Resurrection Altar. He can fire electric blasts.

References

External links
 World of Black Heroes: Baron Macabre Biography

Characters created by Gil Kane
Comics characters introduced in 1974
Marvel Comics characters with superhuman strength
Marvel Comics male supervillains
Marvel Comics mutates
Marvel Comics supervillains
Wakandans